Morrow Aircraft Corporation was American aircraft and aerospace manufacturing company in San Bernardino, California. It developed a process to build airplanes out of plastic impregnated wood.

History
Plans for a $65,000 plant at the yet-completed Municipal Airport, San Bernardino were announced in October 1940. By the dedication of the airport in December, construction had started on the facility. The  plant was somewhat unique in that it was completely air conditioned. After originally facing a shortage of engineers, the company tripled its staff and moved to the new location in May 1941. The company received a certificate authorizing expansion a few weeks later.

The was forced to sell its plant to the War Department in February 1942 for $64,000. The following month, the company began removing its equipment to Rialto and the Tri-City Airport. Shortly thereafter, it announced plans to begin hiring women and begin building wooden pilots' seats. In 1943, it became the Morrow Aircraft-Ziebrach Joint Adventure.

Aircraft

See also
 California during World War II

References

External links
 USC Library of Aeronautical History Morrow Aircraft scrapbook – Online Archive of California
 Compression Tests of Stiffened Wooden Panels for Morrow Aircraft Corporation – Google Books
 Shear Tests on Wooden Specimens for Morrow Aircraft Corporation – Google Books

Aerospace companies of the United States
Companies based in California
Defunct aircraft manufacturers of the United States
Manufacturing companies based in California